Harleston was launched at Ipswich in 1811, for Peter E. Mestaer. She made one voyage under charter to the British East India Company. Around 1813, she apparently sailed for Bengal and then became a country ship in India; she was still listed in 1823, but was not listed in 1829

EIC voyage
Harleston first appears in the Register of Shipping and Lloyd's Register in 1812 in lists of vessels trading with India. Both give her origin as Liverpool, her owner as Mestear, and the date of sailing for Bengal as 21 June 1811. In addition, Lloyd's Register gives the name of her master as T. Walker.

Captain Thomas Walker sailed from Portsmouth on 21 June 1811, bound for Bengal.

Harleston reached Calcutta on 2 November. Homeward bound (albeit indirectly), she was at Saugor on 2 January 1812, and then reached Bencoolen on 25 January. She reached Saint Helena on 12 May and arrived at the Downs on 23 July.

Subsequent career
Harleston sailed out to Bengal to remain there as a country ship. In 1823 Harleston, of 537 tons (bm), and built in England, was under the command of D. Proudfoot. Her owner was Davypersaud Ghose.

Notes

Citations

References
 
 
India Office and Burma Office List (1823). (H.M. Stationery Office)

1811 ships
Ships of the British East India Company
Age of Sail merchant ships
Merchant ships of the United Kingdom